Ueda (上田 or 植田), romanized as Uyeda in an old version of Hepburn romanization, is the 60th most common Japanese surname. Notable people with the surname include:

Ai Ueda (上田藍, born 1983), professional triathlete
Akinari Ueda (1734–1809), Japanese author, scholar and waka poet
Akira Ueda (上田 晃, born 1970), video game designer
Arisawa Ueda (上田有沢, 1850-1921), Imperial Japanese Navy admiral 
Bin Ueda (上田 敏, 1874–1916), writer and translator
Fumito Ueda (上田 文人, born 1970), video game designer
, Japanese swimmer
Hatsumi Ueda, Japanese shogi player
Hiroki Ueda, Japanese biologist
, Japanese table tennis player
Kana Ueda (植田 佳奈, born 1980), Japanese singer and voice actress
, Japanese kickboxer, martial artist and professional wrestler
Keisuke Ueda (植田 圭輔, born 1989), Japanese actor, voice actor and singer
Ken-ichi Ueda (植田 憲一), Japanese laser scientist
Kenkichi Ueda (植田謙吉, 1875–1962), general in the Imperial Japanese Army during the Second Sino-Japanese War
Makoto Ueda (architecture critic) (植田実, born 1935), editor and architecture critic
Makoto Ueda (poetry critic) (上田真, 1931–2020), professor, author of numerous books about Japanese poetry
Masaharu Ueda (born 1938), Japanese cinematographer
Miyuki Ueda (上田みゆき, 1944), Japanese actress and voice actress
Reina Ueda (上田 麗奈, born 1994), Japanese voice actress and singer
Rinko Ueda, Japanese manga artist
, Japanese footballer
, Japanese footballer
Seiji Ueda (上田清二, born 1952), astronomer, asteroid hunter
, Japanese comedian and television presenter
Shizuteru Ueda (上田 閑照, born 1926), Japanese philosopher specializing in philosophy of religion
Shōji Ueda (植田 正治, 1913–2000), photographer
, Japanese samurai
, Japanese writer
, Japanese badminton player
Tatsuya Ueda (上田 竜也, born 1983), member of Japanese boy band Kat-tun
Toshiko Ueda (上田 トシコ, 1917–2008), manga artist
Toyozo Ueda (上田 豊三, born 1937), Japanese Supreme Court justice
Yōji Ueda (上田 燿司, born 1974), Japanese voice actor
Yūji Ueda (上田 祐司, born 1967), Japanese voice actor

See also
Ueta, a Japanese surname written the same way

References

Japanese-language surnames